The PWX Tag Team Championship is a professional wrestling Tag Team championship in Pro Wrestling eXpress (PWX). Introduced in 1996, it was PWX's original tag team title, and third tag team title overall. It was unified with the NWA East and PWL Tag Team Championships, which PWX recognized as the "NWA East / PWX Tag Team Championship". The title reverted to its original name when PWX left the National Wrestling Alliance in 2012.

Some reigns were held by champions using a ring name, while others used their real name. There have been a total of 70 recognized teams and 164 recognized individual champions, who have had a combined 90 official reigns. The first champions were Sean "Shocker" Evans and Vince Charming who defeated The Wrong Crowd (Brian Anthony and Paul Atlas) in a tournament final held at the Eastland Mall.

Four teams - The Enforcers (Crusher Hansen and Maxx Daniels), Da Munchies (Dick Trimmins and 2 Kool Abdul), The Premiere Players (Dash Bennett and Daron Smythe) and The Wrong Crowd (Brian Anthony and Paul Atlas) - are tied for the record of most reigns, with three each. Paul Atlas and Gator have the most individual reigns with seven each. Only one tag team has held the titles for 365 or more days: The Order of Total Oblivion (Shirley Doe and Apollyon), whose second reign set the record at 385 days. The Wrong Crowd is the team with the longest combined reign at 455 days, while Paul Atlas has the longest combined reign as an individual at 900 days.

The following is a chronological list of teams that have been PWX Tag Team Champions by ring name.

Title history

Names

Reigns

Combined reigns

By team

By wrestler

See also 
 List of former championships in Pro Wrestling eXpress

Footnotes

References
General
[G] 

Specific

External links
Official World Tag Team Championship Title History
PWX Tag Team Championship and NWA East / PWX Tag Team Championship on Cagematch.net
PWX Tag Team Championship on Wrestlingdata.com

Tag team wrestling championships